Captain Wynn Bagnall MC (10 February 1890 – 7 March 1931), was a Canadian soldier who distinguished himself in World War I.   His obituary in The New York Times described him as a Canadian War Hero.  As a recipient of the Military Cross for gallantry, Bagnall's specific war record was the inspiration behind a statue in Winnipeg, Canada, by James Earle Fraser, designed to honour the heroism of Canadians who had fought and often died. Bagnall was the model for the statue which was dedicated in December 1923 and 'inspired memory and reverence for lost Canadian soldiers in all the years it has stood'. The statue was also described as 'one of the finest memorials yet produced' and won a gold medal for sculpture in New York City in 1925.

On 11 March 1931, Bagnall was buried with full military honours at Cypress Hills Cemetery, Long Island.

Life
Wynn Bagnall was born in Sunderland, England on 10 February 1890, the son of George Rhydero Bagnall, a British banker who died when Wynn Bagnall was seven, and Anne (née Hughes). He was educated as a boarder at Bedford Modern School. After school, in 1906 Bagnall emigrated to Canada to become a rancher in Calgary, returning to England in 1909 and then back to Canada to join the Bank of Montreal as a clerk in July 1910.

At the outbreak of World War I, Bagnall enlisted as a Gunner in the 6th Battery of the Canadian Field Artillery, going to France in 1915. Shortly after arriving in France, he wrote a letter to his old school to express his initial experience of trench warfare:

In 1916 Bagnall was appointed Lieutenant in the 23rd Battery of the Canadian Field Artillery before being attached to the 5th Battery. In 1917 he was Orderly Officer and then Adjutant in the 2nd Brigade of the Canadian Field Artillery. In March 2018 he was promoted to captain and joined the 58th Battery of the Canadian Field Artillery where for three months he was Acting Major.

In total, Bagnall won four medals during World War I including the Military Cross for 'marked gallantry and initiative' during the Second Battle of Cambrai. The citation to his Military Cross read:

After the war, Bagnall returned to the Bank of Montreal. James Earle Fraser considered Bagnall to be the embodiment of the entire Canadian army during the Great War. As a model and inspiration for his work, Fraser didn't want a private or a general but an officer, and Bagnall had enlisted as a private rising to the rank of Captain through his dedication, determination and courage.  In Fraser's own words:

The statue was described as 'one of the finest memorials yet produced' and won a gold medal for sculpture in New York City in 1925. At the granite base of the statue was placed a box containing a signed photograph of Sir Vincent Meredith, President of the Bank of Montreal, a signed photograph of Sir Frederick Williams-Taylor, a signed photograph of Sir James Atkins, Lieutenant-Governor of Manitoba, and the Bank of Montreal Memorial Book.  In his biography of James Earle Fraser, A.L. Freundich wrote about the Bagnall statue:

Bagnall moved to New York City in 1920 to continue his career in finance.  He lived on Wall Street itself and later on East 55th Street in Manhattan. In the latter years of his life he was associated with S. W. Straus and the Fred F. French Company describing himself as a financial salesman and accountant.

Bagnall married Adelaide A. Clough in 1926 but they divorced in 1930.
He died on 7 March 1931 and was buried on 11 March 1931 with full military honours at Cypress Hills Cemetery, Long Island. He was survived by his mother, Mrs. George Bagnall of Selsey-On-Sea, Sussex, England, together with two sisters and two brothers. His obituary in The New York Times described him as a Canadian War Hero.

References 

1890 births
1931 deaths
People from Sunderland
Recipients of the Military Cross
Canadian military personnel of World War I
People educated at Bedford Modern School